Shakil Afridi, or Shakeel Afridi, is a Pakistani physician who allegedly helped the CIA run a fake hepatitis vaccine program in Abbottabad, Khyber Pakhtunkhwa, Pakistan, in order to confirm Osama bin Laden's presence in the city by obtaining DNA samples. Details of his activities emerged during the Pakistani investigation of the deadly raid on bin Laden's residence.
This account is disputed in a recent account of events which implies Afridi was implicated as a cover for the real CIA operative.
Afridi was arrested at the Torkham while trying to flee the country days after the raid. On 23 May 2012, he was sentenced to 33 years' imprisonment for treason, initially believed to be in connection with the bin Laden raid, but later revealed to be due to alleged ties with a local Islamist warlord Mangal Bagh. Lawyers appealed against the verdict on 1 June 2012. On 29 August 2013, his sentence was overturned and a retrial ordered.

In mid-November 2013, he was charged with murder in regard to the death of a patient he had treated eight years previously. During PM Imran Khan's visit to Washington DC, in July 2019, in his interview with an American Channel he indicated Shakil Afridi could be released in exchange for Aafia Siddiqui.

Biography
Afridi comes from a Pashtun family and in 1990 graduated from the Khyber Medical College, Peshawar. He had been working as the doctor in-charge of Khyber Agency of the former Federally Administered Tribal Areas of Pakistan. The doctor has a family. Considered an American hero by many who believe his actions were altruistic, Afridi is currently serving a 33-year sentence in a Pakistani jail, convicted of charges unrelated to his alleged CIA connections. Sentenced for supporting a Pakistani warlord, many of Afridi's supporters appear to have abandoned him at home and abroad, including his alleged U.S. supporters within the CIA and the Obama Administration. He is a native of Khyber Agency. In July 2011, Afridi was described as being in his late 40s. There are numerous online petitions and web pages dedicated to freeing him, such as the "Free Dr. Shakil Afridi NOW" Facebook page with over 400 likes.

Pakistan's accusations against Afridi
Afridi was the chief surgeon at Jamrud Hospital in Pakistan's northwestern Khyber tribal region. His colleagues were suspicious of Afridi's absences, which he explained as "business" to attend to in Abbottabad. Afridi was accused of having taken a half-dozen World Health Organization cooler boxes without authorisation. The containers are for inoculation campaigns, but no immunisation drives were underway in Abbottabad or the Khyber Agency.

On 6 October 2011, the Pakistani commission investigating bin Laden's death recommended that he be charged with "conspiracy against the state of Pakistan and high treason" on the basis of available evidence. Pakistan seized Afridi's assets. Afridi's residence was sealed by Pakistani authorities and his family moved to an undisclosed location. The fifteen male and female health workers who assisted Afridi in the fake hepatitis vaccination program were also declared not fit for any future employment.

Pakistani investigators said in a July 2012 report that Afridi met 25 times with "foreign secret agents, received instructions and provided sensitive information to them." According to Pakistani reports, Afridi told investigators that the charity Save the Children helped facilitate his meeting with U.S. intelligence agents although the charity denies the charge. The report alleges that Save the Children's Pakistan director introduced Afridi to a western woman in Islamabad and that Afridi and the woman met regularly afterwards.

Torture
In an interview with Fox News, Afridi described being routinely tortured by the Pakistani Inter-Services Intelligence (ISI) with cigarette burns and electric shocks while at ISI Headquarters at Aabpara. Citing "very strict security," Afridi's lawyer told BBC News that he had doubts of the authenticity of the interview. Di-Natale was blacklisted by Pakistan barring him from returning to the country and Fox News reporter/producer Sib Kaifee was grilled by the country's top intelligence agency and was forced to flee the country fearing reprisal.

Family members and a member of his legal counsel also stated Afridi had been tortured while in Pakistani custody during November 2012. In March 2014, Waad ur Rahman, an Express Tribune blogger argued that through a fair trial, Afridi would also have a chance to defend why he did not disclose the location of bin Laden to Pakistani authorities. He said, only denial of fair trial, makes him an absolute victim of law.

Sentencing
On 28 May 2012, Prime Minister Yousaf Raza Gillani said according to the law in Pakistan, Afridi has the right to defend himself and should be granted access to higher courts.

On 30 May 2012, Afridi was sentenced to 33 years in prison for aiding banned militant group Lashkar-e-Islam and not for his links to the CIA, as officials had said earlier, according to a court document.

The court sentenced Afridi under the Frontier Crimes Regulation, 1901 a colonial era law. According to the verdict, Afridi would serve 33 years in prison and has to pay Rs. 230,000 as a fine. He was initially detained at the Apbara headquarters of the ISI in Islamabad before being moved to a Peshawar Central Jail in May 2012.

On 1 June 2012, Afridi's lawyers appealed his conviction.

On 29 August 2013, senior Pakistani judicial official Sahibzada Mohammad Anis issued a ruling that overturned Afridi's sentence and ordered him a retrial. This was due to the decision that the original person who sentenced the doctor was not authorised to hear the case.

In mid-November 2013, the Reuters news agency reported that he had just been charged with murder in regard to the death, eight years earlier, of a patient he had treated. In March 2015, Samiullah Khan Afridi, Afridi's former lawyer, was shot dead in Peshawar. A Pakistani Taliban faction named Jamaat-ul-Ahrar claimed responsibility for his murder.

In May 2018, Afridi was moved from prison to a 'safer location' by Pakistani intelligence officials.

Hunger strike and current condition
In late November 2012 Pakistani news provider, The Express Tribune, reported that Afridi had gone on a hunger strike protesting his prison conditions in the Peshawar jail. News also reported that regarding his treatment the U.S. State Department had "made their views well known to Pakistan and the public at large." In September 2012, Dominic Di-Natale, an Islamabad-based correspondent and Sib Kaifee, a producer/reporter for Fox News claimed that they had interviewed Afridi by phone from inside the jail and spoke to him thrice between five and 45 minutes. Two prison guards were arrested and a senior prison official was sacked for allegedly providing Afridi with cell phones.

He is isolated from the general population.

Reactions to arrest and sentencing

U.S. response
The U.S. Secretary of Defense, who was then former CIA Chief Leon Panetta, has confirmed the role of Afridi in ascertaining the whereabouts of bin Laden inside the compound in Abbottabad. U.S. Secretary of State Hillary Clinton has said that Pakistan has no justification for holding Afridi. The U.S. Representative for the 48th District of California, Dana Rohrabacher asked President Barack Obama to intercede on Afridi's behalf, introduced two bills, H.R. 4069 to award a Congressional Gold Medal to Afridi and H.R. 3901 to declare Afridi a naturalised U.S. citizen.

The U.S. Senate panel cut $33 million in aid to Pakistan over the conviction of Afridi: $1 million for each of the 33 years of Afridi's sentence.

U.S. authorities said that before his arrest, Afridi turned down an opportunity to leave his country and resettle overseas with his family. On 31 May 2012, U.S. authorities said that they sought clarification from Pakistan on the issue of Afridi's sentence.

In June 2011, it was reported in The New York Times, The Washington Post and all over the Pakistani press that Amir Aziz had been held for questioning in Pakistan; he was, it was said, a CIA informant who had been spying on the comings and goings at the bin Laden compound. Aziz was released, but the retired official said that U.S. intelligence was unable to learn who leaked the highly classified information about his involvement with the mission. Officials in Washington decided they "could not take a chance that Aziz's role in obtaining bin Laden's DNA also would become known." A sacrificial lamb was needed, and the one chosen was Afridi, a 48-year-old Pakistani doctor and sometime CIA asset, who had been arrested by the Pakistanis in late May and accused of assisting the agency. "We went to the Pakistanis and said go after Afridi", the retired official said. "We had to cover the whole issue of how we got the DNA." It was soon reported that the CIA had organised a fake vaccination programme in Abbottabad with Afridi's help in a failed attempt to obtain bin Laden's DNA. Afridi's legitimate medical operation was run independently of local health authorities, was well financed and offered free vaccinations against hepatitis B. Posters advertising the programme were displayed throughout the area. Afridi was later accused of treason and sentenced to 33 years in prison because of his ties to an extremist. News of the CIA-sponsored programme created widespread anger in Pakistan, and led to the cancellation of other international vaccination programmes that were now seen as cover for American spying.

The retired official said that Afridi had been recruited long before the bin Laden mission as part of a separate intelligence effort to get information about suspected terrorists in Abbottabad and the surrounding area. "The plan was to use vaccinations as a way to get the blood of terrorism suspects in the villages." Afridi made no attempt to obtain DNA from the residents of the bin Laden compound. The report that he did so was a hurriedly put together "CIA cover story creating 'facts'" in a clumsy attempt to protect Aziz and his real mission. "Now we have the consequences", the retired official said. "A great humanitarian project to do something meaningful for the peasants has been compromised as a cynical hoax." Afridi's conviction was overturned, but he remains in prison on a murder charge.

James Curran, dean of the Rollins School of Public Health at Emory University, stated that spy agencies should consider the consequences of using health care institutions for their own ends: "It is always important to disassociate public health missions from wartime or spy missions that could disrupt the bonds of community trust."

Protest by aid groups
Humanitarian organisations, including Médecins Sans Frontières, protested the use of a medical charity for espionage purposes believing it would cause suspicion of such organisations in the future and endanger personnel working on such projects claiming 'threatened immunisation work around the world'.

May 2012 the Access to Justice Through Legal Aid and Welfare Organisation Peshawar named a panel of lawyers to defend Dr Afridi in his appeal against his conviction.

Lashkar-e-Islam reaction
On 31 May 2012, Lashkar-e-Islam militants said they had nothing to do with Afridi and would kill him if given the chance. A commander in the militant organisation told the AFP, "We have no link to such a shameless man. If we see him, we'll chew him alive."

The court said Afridi paid two million rupees (US$21,000) to Lashkar-e-Islam and helped to provide medical assistance to militant commanders in Khyber. But the commander said the $21,000 was a fine imposed for over-charging patients. "Afridi and his fellow doctor were fleecing tribesmen, giving them fake medicines and doing fake surgeries. We had a lot of complaints against them and imposed a fine of two million rupees on them," he said. Local residents have also told AFP that Mangal Bagh fined Afridi for performing "unnecessary surgeries and over-charging" patients at his private clinic in the town of Bara.

See also
CIA activities in Pakistan
Jamrud, located in the Federally Administered Tribal Areas, where the hospital was that Afridi was the chief surgeon of.

References

External links
InterAction Letter to the CIA criticizing his use of a medical charity for espionage purposes. 
Pakistan Doctor, Who Helped CIA, Accused Of Treason, NPR, 2011-10-07
Dr Shakeel Afridi, who helped US to kill Osama, The News, 2012-05-28
Dr Shakil Afridi awarded unilateral sentence: brother, Geo News Pakistan, 28 May 2012
33-year sentence on treason charges Lawyers' panel, NGO to defend Dr Shakeel Afridi, The News International, 28 May 2012
Divergent Pak-US perceptions on Shakil Afridi , The News International, 1 June 2012
Twists in the Afridi case, The News International, 5 June 2012

Pashtun people
Pakistani medical doctors
Killing of Osama bin Laden
Pakistani spies
Pakistani whistleblowers
CIA activities in Pakistan
Living people
People from Khyber District
People convicted of treason against Pakistan
1962 births
People convicted of espionage in Pakistan
Khyber Medical College alumni